The 1976–77 Yugoslav First Basketball League season was the 33rd season of the Yugoslav First Basketball League, the highest professional basketball league in SFR Yugoslavia.

Classification 

Due to a tie at the top between Jugoplastika and Bosna after the end of the regular season, the season champion was decided in a one-game playoff between the two teams at a neutral venue. The game was played in Belgrade's Hala Pionir.

One-game playoff for the championship 
Hala Pionir, Belgrade

Jugoplastika vs Bosna: 98-96

The winning roster of Jugoplastika:
  Mlađan Tudor
  Željko Jerkov
  Slobodan Bjelajac
  Branko Macura
  Ratomir Tvrdić
  Ivica Dukan
  Damir Šolman
  Duje Krstulović
  Mirko Grgin
  Mihajlo Manović
  Mladen Bratić
  Ivan Sunara
  Deni Kuvačić

Coach:  Petar Skansi

Scoring leaders
 Dražen Dalipagić (Partizan) - ___ points (34.8ppg)

Qualification in 1977-78 season European competitions 

FIBA European Champions Cup
 Jugoplastika (champions)

FIBA Cup Winner's Cup
 Kvarner (Cup finalist)

FIBA Korać Cup
 Bosna (2nd)
 Partizan (3rd)
 Cibona (4th)
 Beko Beograd (5th)

References

Yugoslav First Basketball League seasons
Yugo
Yugo